The A4 is a motorway connecting Tunis and Bizerte.

References

Motorways in Tunisia